The American Eagle A-129 was an American biplane first flown in 1929.

Design and development
The preceding American Eagle A-101 of 1926 had achieved some success, but its fierce spin characteristics had resulted in several crashes during training flights. Giuseppe Bellanca redesigned the biplane with a longer fuselage and narrower cowling to accommodate the five-cylinder Kinner K-5 100 h.p. radial engine, which had its cylinder heads exposed. To mark the year of its first appearance, the designation A-129 was applied.

Operational history
Initially designed to replace the Porterfield Flying Schools A-101s, the new biplane proved to have good flying characteristics and more than 400 were built. The aircraft were also flown by "barnstormers" and sports pilots.

Several A-129s remain airworthy and examples are preserved at the Rhinebeck Aerodrome Museum at Old Rhinebeck in New York state and in the Kansas Aviation Museum Wichita, Kansas.

Variants
A range of engines was fitted to the A-129 without changing the type designation. They included the  Curtiss OX-5 straight engine and others up to the 200 h.p. Wright J-4.

The American Eagle A-229 was a two seat trainer version with a Curtiss OX-5 engine.

Specifications (100 h.p. Kinner K-5)

References
Notes

Bibliography

External links

 Aerofiles American Eagle page

1920s United States civil utility aircraft
Biplanes
Single-engined tractor aircraft
Aircraft first flown in 1929